This list, 2014 in molluscan paleontology, is a list of new taxa of ammonites and other fossil cephalopods, as well as fossil gastropods, bivalves and other molluscs that have been described during the year 2014.

Newly named ammonites

Other cephalopods

Newly named gastropods

Other molluscs

References

 
Molluscs
Paleomalacology